The Icon of Christ and Abbot Mena, also often known as Christ and His Friend, is a Coptic painting which is now in the Louvre museum in Paris, depicting Jesus Christ and Saint Menas together. The icon is an encaustic painting on wood and was brought from the Apollo monastery in Bawit, Egypt. The icon measures about 57x57cm (22 7/16 x 22 7/16 in) and is 2 cm thick. The icon has been damaged over the years, with some of the pigment missing and it has two vertical cracks running through the image, yet is still in relative great condition and can still be readily analyzed.

Description
Dated to the 8th century, the icon depicts Christ with his cruciform halo behind him and standing next to Abbot Saint Menas (from the fifth century, not to be confused with Saint Menas the martyr of the early fourth centuryAD) who is also depicted with a halo indicating his sainthood. We know that the icon is of Jesus Christ and the abbot because there is writing above each of their heads stating "ΨΟΤΕΡ (Savior)" and "ΑΠΑ ΜΗΝΑ ΠΡΟΕΙCΤΟC (Father Mena, guardian)" when translated.  With an ornately designed Bible with jewels adorning the cover in his left hand and his right hand on the abbot's far shoulder, Christ is asserting protection over Mena. The two are side-by-side with the abbot being slightly smaller when compared, clutching a scroll in one hand with the other hand gesturing in a blessing motion.

Christ, with his arm around the abbot is giving a sort of "introduction to the people" as he takes his place with the angels. Both are shown wearing a tunic and pallium, though of different colors. (Christ in purple with blue highlight and Mena in brown.) Christ has a small round beard, mustache and long wavy hair and Mena is grey-haired and bearded. The noticeably large eyes are intended to be exaggerated in the composition. The color gradients where the background has green and brown hills that blend into an apricot-hued sky are clearly 6th century design, indicative of the Coptic, the largest Christian group in the region. The Egyptian church developed its own art traditions during the 6th century and used them in creating this icon and others like it.

Monastery of Bawit
When the monastery of Bawit was excavated, along with this icon of Christ many other works were discovered. Whole rooms covered in icons of saints were found and one icon Our father Abraham, the Bishop was also removed from the monastery. Because the idea of sainthood was in transition, many works were created to resemble those that would indicate the image is of a saint; this was to insure if the person was later to be acknowledged as a saint, then there would be no need to retouch the portrait. The monastery, which is located on the west bank of the River Nile, was excavated in the twentieth century by a team from the Institut Français d'Archéologie Orientale, which was led by Jean Cledet and Jean Maspero.

References

Bibliography
 Belting, Hans, and Edmund Jephcott (2014). Likeness and presence: a history of the image before the era of art. The University of Chicago Press. 
 Gabra, Gawdat, and Hany N. Takla (2015). Christianity and monasticism in Middle Egypt. The American University in Cairo Press. 
 Meinardus, Otto F. A. (2016). Two Thousand Years of Coptic Christianity. The American University in Cairo Press.            
 “Obo.” Marie de France  (2017).  Medieval Studies – Oxford Bibliographies, 20 Nov.
 Weitzmann, Kurt (1979). Age of spirituality: late antique and early Christian art, third to seventh century. The Metropolitan Museum of Art. 

8th-century paintings
Paintings depicting Jesus
Coptic art
Paintings in the Louvre by Egyptian artists